Trochilini is one of the three tribes that make up the subfamily Trochilinae in the hummingbird family Trochilidae. The other two tribes in the subfamily are Lampornithini (mountain gems) and Mellisugini (bees).

The informal name "emeralds" has been proposed for this group. Several genera contain species with "emerald" in their common name including Chlorostilbon which contains ten. The tribe contains 114 species divided into 36 genera.

Phylogeny
A molecular phylogenetic study of the hummingbirds published in 2007 found that the species formed nine major clades. When Edward Dickinson and James Van Remsen, Jr. updated the Howard and Moore Complete Checklist of the Birds of the World for the 4th edition in 2013 they based their classification on these results and placed three of the nine clades in the subfamily Trochilinae. The clades were placed in separate tribes which they named Trochilini (emeralds), Lampornithini (mountain gems) and Mellisugini (bees). The tribe Trochilini with the current circumscription was introduced in 2009.

Molecular phylogenetic studies by Jimmy McGuire and collaborators published between 2007 and 2014 determined the relationships between the major groups of hummingbirds. In the cladogram below the English names are those introduced in 1997. The Latin names are those proposed by Dickinson and Remsen in 2013.
 

The 2014 study by McGuire lead to a major revision of the classification of the Trochilini. Many of the traditional genera were found to be polyphyletic and as a result the classification was substantially revised as shown below in the cladogram. Only one new genus was introduced (Elliotomyia) but eleven genera were resurrected (Phaeoptila, Riccordia, Pampa, Thaumasius, Talaphorus, Leucolia, Saucerottia, Amazilis, Uranomitra, Chionomesa and Polyerata). At the same time six of the former genera were synonymized (Aphantochroa, Cyanophaia, Elvira, Goethalsia, Juliamyia and Lepidopyga).

Taxonomic list
The tribe contains 36 genera.

References

Sources

 

Bird tribes